Nathan Norton (born August 4, 1993) is an American actor. He co-starred with Lukas Haas and Kelli Garner in The Youth in Us. Directed by Joshua Leonard, the film achieved cult status after premiering at the Sundance Film Festival.

Nathan had a recurring role in the HBO series, Six Feet Under, and has made guest appearances on numerous television shows, including Without a Trace, ER, Touched by an Angel, Strong Medicine, Grounded for Life, and Just Shoot Me!. He also appeared in a role in the pilot for the comedy Cracking Up.

Norton has also done voice over work on several commercials, as well as the film, Cirque du Freak: The Vampire's Assistant.

References

External links

1993 births
American male film actors
Living people
20th-century American male actors
21st-century American male actors

hr:Nathan Norton